The  is a compact car produced by Toyota. Its name derives from the exclamation for surprise in Portuguese.

It was introduced at the October 1999 Tokyo Motor Show as a prototype car, and was put into production in January 2000. It was the result of the V50 Vista Ardeo wagon modified into a 5-door hatchback. The transmission shifter was relocated from the floor between the front seats to a location on the lower portion of the dashboard, allowing passengers to walk to the rear area from either front seat. It was initially available with the 1.8-litre 1ZZ-FE engine. Later in August 2000, the Opa was offered to customers with the 2.0-litre 1AZ-FSE engine and a continuously variable transmission. In January 2001, the GPS navigation was offered as an option.

The Opa was exclusive to Toyopet Store locations as a larger companion to the Caldina station wagon. It was discontinued in August 2005.

References 

Opa
Cars introduced in 2000
Cars discontinued in 2005
Compact cars
Hatchbacks
Front-wheel-drive vehicles
All-wheel-drive vehicles
Vehicles with CVT transmission